Feminist Review is a triannual peer-reviewed academic journal with a focus on exploring gender in its multiple forms and interrelationships. The journal was established in 1979. It is published by SAGE Publishing and is edited by a collective.

Abstracting and indexing

According to the Journal Citation Reports, the journal has a 2018 impact factor of 0.932.

See also
Gender studies
List of women's studies journals
Feminist Studies
Signs
Frontiers: A Journal of Women Studies

References

External links

English-language journals
Feminist journals
SAGE Publishing academic journals
Publications established in 1979
Triannual journals
Women's studies journals